Jorge Bladimir Pinos Haiman (born 3 October 1989) is an Ecuadorian footballer who plays for 9 de Octubre as a goalkeeper.

External links

1989 births
Living people
People from Quevedo, Ecuador
Ecuadorian footballers
Association football goalkeepers
Ecuadorian Serie A players
Ecuadorian Serie B players
Barcelona S.C. footballers
C.D. Quevedo footballers
Delfín S.C. footballers
L.D.U. Portoviejo footballers
C.D. Técnico Universitario footballers
C.S.D. Independiente del Valle footballers